This is a list of American television-related events in 1958.

Events

Other television-related events in 1958
 Ampex demonstrates their design for a color video tape recorder.

Television programs

Debuts

Ending this year

Networks and services

Network launches

Network closures

Television stations

Station launches

Network affiliation changes

Station closures

Births

Deaths

See also 
 1958 in television 
 1958 in film 
 1958 in the United States 
 List of American films of 1958

References

External links 
 List of 1958 American television series at IMDb